The British School of Milan (BSM), formerly "The Sir James Henderson School," is a non-profit English-language IB World School founded in 1969 by members of the British Community in Milan, with support from the British Chambers of Commerce. The school was named after Sir James Henderson, a Scottish businessman who opened Cucirini Cantoni Coats S.p.A. in 1911 in Milan.

The school's first location was in Via Mancinelli, 3, with separate premises for the Senior School opening in Viale Lombardia not long after. In 1996, the school moved to its current location in Via Pisani Dossi, reuniting the Primary and Senior Schools on one campus.

The objective of the school is to provide British education, following the English National curriculum, to pupils ranging in age from 3 to 18 from over 40 nationalities.

In 2010, the school's marketing manager, Gregory Wright, stated that the teachers always took a practical approach to education, not merely reciting information but also involving the students in the demonstration of lessons. Science, he said, is always taught in the laboratories, not merely an hour a week, but always. Extracurricular activities (art, music, sports) and interest groups on world issues (the environment, the United Nations) are also highly emphasized.

Notable alumni
Allegra Versace

References

External links
 Official School Website 
 The British School of Milan, Sir James Henderson, directed by Marco Cattaneo

Milan
International schools in Milan
Secondary schools in Italy
International Baccalaureate schools in Italy
Educational institutions established in 1969